The Henry C. Gale House at 495 N. 1st East, Beaver, Utah was built in 1889, of pink rock. It has had three additions since its construction. It is believed to have been built by local Scots stonemason Alexander Boyter.  It was listed on the National Register of Historic Places in 1983.

Originally it was a one-and-a-half-story hall and parlor plan cottage.  It has a Greek Revival-style cornice.

See also
Henry C. Gale House (500 North)

References

Houses on the National Register of Historic Places in Utah
Greek Revival houses in Utah
Houses completed in 1889
Houses in Beaver County, Utah
National Register of Historic Places in Beaver County, Utah